The A35 autoroute is a toll free motorway in northeastern France.  It is also known as the Autoroute des cigognes and the Voie Rapide du Piémont des Vosges. It connects the German border in the Rhine valley with the Swiss frontier via Strasbourg. The road forms part of European routes E25 and E60.

At the northern end, where the road reaches the German frontier, it becomes a single carriageway road controlled by a speed camera. On the German side of the frontier, plans to build a final stretch of Autobahn to connect the French A35 directly with the German A65 at Kandel were not implemented during the 1990s when the focus of Autobahn construction switched to the eastern side of the country. The project remains unimplemented: it is contentious because of the ecological impact it could have on the Bienwald (wooded area) through which the road would run.

Junctions
 

As A35

As the A4

As the A35

As the D1422 

As the A35

As the N83 

As the A35

External links
 A35 Motorway in Saratlas

A35